The State Anthem of Kabardino-Balkaria is the state anthem of Kabardino-Balkaria, a federal subject of Russia in the North Caucasus, and was composed by Khasan Kardanov in 1992.

History 
Khasan Kardanov won a competition to select the music of the anthem of Kabardino-Balkaria with a composition based on the intonations and colours of Kabardian, Balkar and Russian folk songs. A commission was then established to select lyrics for the anthem.

Lyrics

References

External links 
 Гимн Кабардино-Балкарии - Нальчик - сайт города iNalchik.ru (for lyrics)
 Гимн КБР - Nalchik.ru

Kabardino-Balkaria
Kabardino-Balkaria
1992 songs
Regional songs
National anthems
National anthem compositions in E major